The Sri Lankan cricket team toured Bangladesh between 21 December 2008 and 14 January 2009. The team played two Tests and took part in a three match One Day International tournament also featuring Zimbabwe.

Squads

Tour matches

Three-day: Bangladesh Cricket Board XI vs Sri Lankans

Test series

1st Test

2nd Test

References

2008 in Bangladeshi cricket
2008 in Sri Lankan cricket
2009 in Bangladeshi cricket
2009 in Sri Lankan cricket
Bangladeshi cricket seasons from 2000–01
International cricket competitions in 2008–09
2008-09